Yusva is a rural locality (a selo) and the administrative center of Yusvinsky District, Komi-Permyak Okrug, Perm Krai, Russia. Population:

References

Notes

Sources

Rural localities in Yusvinsky District